The Labor Union is the second studio album by underground rapper King Syze. It was officially released on 5 August 2008 via Babygrande Records.

Background
In 2008, King Syze released his second studio album The Labor Union. The album was known for "Syze lacing his relentless, rapid-fire flow over a slew of spine-tingling gutter tracks" It contained production from Team 707, DJ Waxwork, Skammadix, and MTK. The album was considered an underground cult classic.

Track listing

References

2008 albums
Babygrande Records albums
King Syze albums